Hyalesthes is a bug genus in the family Cixiidae.

H. obsoletus is the vector of the Black wood disease of grapevine.

Species 
 Hyalesthes angustulus
 Hyalesthes askalensis
 Hyalesthes aylanus
 Hyalesthes carinifrons
 Hyalesthes diyala
 Hyalesthes duffelsi
 Hyalesthes flavipennis
 Hyalesthes flavovaria
 Hyalesthes hani
 Hyalesthes luteipes
 Hyalesthes madeires
 Hyalesthes mavromoustkisi
 Hyalesthes mlokosiewiczi
 Hyalesthes obsoletus
 Hyalesthes orsoles
 Hyalesthes philesakis
 Hyalesthes ponticorum
 Hyalesthes portonoves
 Hyalesthes productus
 Hyalesthes scotti
 Hyalesthes stylidentata
 Hyalesthes teno
 Hyalesthes thracina
 Hyalesthes tilos
 Hyalesthes verticillata
 Hyalesthes veyseli
 Hyalesthes yozgaticus
 Hyalesthes zabolica

References 

Auchenorrhyncha genera
Cixiidae